Alcides Fonseca Júnior (born 29 August 1958), known as Juninho Fonseca or just Juninho, is a Brazilian former footballer who played as a central defender.

In career he played for clubs Ponte Preta (1974–1983 and 1989), Corinthians (1983–1986), Juventus and Vasco da Gama (1986), Cruzeiro (1987), XV de Piracicaba and Atlético Paranaense (1988), São José (1989), Nacional (1990), Olímpia (1991), and closed his career in Japan Japan Soccer League in 1992 with Yomiuri FC.

He won one São Paulo State League (1983), one Guanabara Cup (1986), and two Japanese League (1991, 1992).

For Brazil national football team he got in 1980-81 four international caps, never scored a goal. He was in the squad for 1982 FIFA World Cup, without playing any game.

References

1958 births
Living people
Brazilian footballers
Brazilian expatriate footballers
Brazil under-20 international footballers
Brazil international footballers
Association football defenders
1982 FIFA World Cup players
Campeonato Brasileiro Série A players
Expatriate footballers in Japan
Japan Soccer League players
Brazilian football managers
Campeonato Brasileiro Série A managers
Associação Atlética Ponte Preta players
Sport Club Corinthians Paulista players
Clube Atlético Juventus players
CR Vasco da Gama players
Cruzeiro Esporte Clube players
Club Athletico Paranaense players
Esporte Clube XV de Novembro (Piracicaba) players
São José Esporte Clube players
Nacional Atlético Clube (SP) players
Tokyo Verdy players
Associação Portuguesa de Desportos managers
São José Esporte Clube managers
Comercial Futebol Clube (Ribeirão Preto) managers
Sampaio Corrêa Futebol Clube managers
Treze Futebol Clube managers
Sport Club Corinthians Paulista managers
Sociedade Esportiva e Recreativa Caxias do Sul managers
Esporte Clube Noroeste managers